Moldir Azimbay (born ) is a Kazakhstani female artistic gymnast and part of the national team.  

She participated at the 2012 Summer Olympics in London, United Kingdom, and the 2011 World Artistic Gymnastics Championships.

References

External links
https://database.fig-gymnastics.com/public/gymnasts/biography/15207/true?backUrl=%2Fpublic%2Fresults%2Fdisplay%2F2146%3FidAgeCategory%3D4%26idCategory%3D65%23anchor_27348
 http://sayskakodkar.blogspot.com/2012/07/london-olympic-gymnast-moldir-azimbay.html
 http://www.flogymnastics.com/video/146834-kazakhstan-moldir-azimbay#.WLHEkFUrLIU
 http://www.gettyimages.com/detail/news-photo/kazakhstans-gymnast-moldir-azimbay-performs-on-the-uneven-news-photo/149467501#kazakhstans-gymnast-moldir-azimbay-performs-on-the-uneven-bars-during-picture-id149467501

1995 births
Living people
Kazakhstani female artistic gymnasts
Gymnasts at the 2012 Summer Olympics
Olympic gymnasts of Kazakhstan
Place of birth missing (living people)
Gymnasts at the 2010 Summer Youth Olympics
21st-century Kazakhstani women